The Basilica of St. John was a basilica  in Ephesus. It was constructed by Justinian I in the 6th century. It stands over the believed burial site of John the Apostle. It was modeled after the now lost Church of the Holy Apostles in Constantinople.

History

Justinian's Church

Little is known about the Basilica of St. John, with its only source being from a small description provided by Procopius in one of his works, Buildings, whereupon he writes:

There chanced to be a certain place before the city of Ephesus, lying on a steep slope hilly and bare of soil and incapable of producing crops, even should one attempt to cultivate them, but altogether hard and rough. On that site the natives had set up a church in early times to the Apostle John; this Apostle has been named “the Theologian,” because the nature of God was described by him in a manner beyond the unaided power of man. This church, which was small and in a ruined condition because of its great age, the Emperor Justinian tore down to the ground and replaced by a church so large and beautiful, that, to speak briefly, it resembles very closely in all respects, and is a rival to, the shrine which is dedicated to all the Apostles in the imperial city...

Construction of the church began by 548 and was completed by 565. The building of this church was presided over by the bishop, Hypatius of Ephesus. As the leading ecclesiastical theoretician and writer of his day, it was possible that he gained the influence of Justinian and had the tomb of St. John reconstructed, as major construction in the Asia Minor was rare.
After its completion, it was regarded as one of the holiest churches of its time and was held in great honor, as Procopius notes in his Secret History:

...to the sanctuary of the Apostle John, which was the most holy one there and held in very high honour...

Despite its popularity after the 9th century it was no longer mentioned, possibly due to a new church built in honor of St. John, Church of John the Theologian.

Design

Materials
The basilica was built almost entirely of brick and stones (ashlar), while the columns would have been made of marble or have  been marble plated, to withstand the weight of the domes above. The use of timber-roofed towers that were placed over the bay preceding the chancel and the altar had been adopted as well since the course of the 5th century.

Construction

The first building to be built on St. John's tomb was a mausoleum of sort, which also served as a church . In the 4th century, a basilica was built over it during the reign of Theodosius. Two centuries later, as the site lay in ruins, Justinian began his construction of a much grander church. In comparison, the Theodosian Basilica measured at 246 x 146 feet while Justinian's Basilica measured at 428 x 213 feet. The plan was laid out on the site of Constantine's Apostoleion and would be arranged in a Greek cross pattern.  And although the construction of this church was by imperial order, the people of Ephesus were the ones who did much of the building. The marble decorations were made in Constantinople and perhaps in Ephesus as well. The bases, column and capitals of the nave were made and imported from Constantinople or the quarries of Proconnesus. While much of the capital of the Eastern part of the church were done by local craftsmen instead, following the Constantinopolitan pattern and model. Even after the reign of Justinian, decorations were still added, most notably by Justin II and Tiberius II

The most striking feature of the basilica is its massive apse attached to the eastern piers of the crossing with an encircling passage between its two walls which is believed to have been tunnel-vaulted.

As Procopius has stated, the land surrounding the church was very uninhabitable nor could it be used to cultivate anything. To solve this, Justinian had an aqueduct built near the church, which in time, greatly helped the city of Ephesus and provided the surroundings of the church to flourish through the centuries.

Exterior

With its resemblance to the Church of the Holy Apostles, the Basilica of St. John also took on the cruciform in its design. The basilica was a domed basilica where the domes were placed over the central crossing, choir, transepts and the nave. Five domes rested on solid piers in the corners of the cross and surmounted the arms and center crossing. To hold such domes in place, massive marble pillars were built and erected to support the domes. Much like the Church of the Holy Apostles, the Basilica of St. John was based on the concept of multiplying the standard element, using short barrel-vaults to expand the square, domed bay into a cross shape. The cupolas of the church would be entirely covered in mosaics as well. Prior to Theodora's death in 548, Justinian had both her monogram and his placed on the capitals.

The main entrance gate to the basilica was called the “Gate of Persecution” while atrium walls that were built would have surrounded the basilica itself. The walls would have consisted of towers that were either empty or used as bastions.

The north side of the church also had a large octagonal baptistery, resembling that of Saint Mary. Near it was a rectangular room with a marble floor and an apse paved with mosaic. An inscription over the door identified it as the  where the bishop would have been when he presided as judge. The inscription also shows that it might have been completed during the time Johannes was bishop, who may have been around during the late 6th century.

Interior

The interior of the vault within the church was covered in mosaic while the walls and pillars were covered in marble plates and decorated in different colors. The floors were also covered in mosaics. Numerous parts of the Basilica were of different arrangement which gave the impression of a large quantity of beautiful enormous oriental carpets covering the entire church “in a fairy-like manner”. Directly beneath the altar laid a crypt with several rooms and of those, the tomb of St. John itself. On the altar itself, the inscription of the 14th verse of the 132nd Psalm can be read where St. John states:

This is my resting place forever, here will I dwell.

The church inside would have also been covered in frescoes. The Ephesus bishop, Hypatius, was known for his advocation in the use of images in the church. After the completion of the St. John's church, the interior was covered by images, representations of saints and scenes from the Old and New Testaments. Paintings would have included those of Christ raising Lazarus from the dead and Christ crowning Justinian and Theodora. Aside from these, other possible epigrams would have appeared inside the church one of which would have been the first book of the Greek Anthology and also paintings that reflect the origins of the church as an imperial commission.

St. John in Ephesus

This is on the stories and legends surrounding St. John during his life in Ephesus, for his:

Journey to Ephesus

It is believed that the Apostle John traveled from Jerusalem to the city of Ephesus where he remained for the rest of his life.  It was during his time there that Emperor Domitian exiled him to the Isle of Patmos, where he wrote Revelation (the Apocalypse).  When Nerva became emperor John was pardoned and returned to Ephesus, where he lived the remainder of his days.

Legends and miracles

During his time and until his death in Ephesus, St John preached about Christianity. According to legend, before he died, Christ, along with all the other apostles, visited St John and said to him:

Come, my beloved one, and join me and all other brethren of thine at my table; the time has finally come to do so,...the Sunday next, thou wilt come to stay henceforth with me.

As the story unfolds, the following Sunday, St. John continued with his preaching of Christianity before finally informing his disciples of his time. Then he entered the cave of his church whereupon an intense light shone, preventing his disciples from entering farther. When the light dissipated, so did St. John. His legend was furthered when the opening of his tomb during Constantine’s reign yielded no body or relics. Another fact that continues to advance the legend of St. John's assumption into Heaven is the fact that while all the other Saints' body or relic has been claimed by at least one or more city/church, St. John (along with Mary, the Mother of Jesus) is the only Saint whose body is not claimed by anyone or anywhere.

It was also said that St. John was not dead in, but sleeping beneath his tomb. And each time he breathed, he would cause the dust around his altar to stir, which in turn, made them holy. Because of this, the dust, called manna, was said to be able to cure the sick.

Pilgrimages and flasks

The stories of St. John and the “manna” continued to grow and even caught the attention of St. Augustine, who could not dismiss them outright. The Anglo-Saxon Willibald, who later became a bishop and a saint, also heard of this and was one of the first many recorded pilgrims to the tomb of St. John.

The tomb itself acted upon its miracle every year on 8 May, during an all night-festal in honor of St. John, for nearly a thousand years, prompting many pilgrimages throughout the medieval period.

The pilgrims who journeyed to Ephesus did not leave empty-handed. Flasks were produced at St. John's tomb for the pilgrims. These flasks usually had the Saint's image designed on to it as well. They were used to collect the dusts that would appear around St. John's tomb, which was then carried back to the pilgrims respective homeland where it was said to have performed miracles by curing sickness and even calm storms on land or sea.

See also
History of Roman and Byzantine domes

References

External links

 Basilica of St. John, Ephesus from sacred-destinations.com
 Photos from Saint John's Basilica from turkishtravelblog.com
 140 Photo's on non-commercial site

Ephesus
Archaeological sites in the Aegean Region
Ruined churches in Turkey
6th-century churches
Buildings of Justinian I
Byzantine church buildings in Turkey
Tombs of apostles